Ambrose "Amby" Gerald Fogarty (11 September 1933 – 4 January 2016) was an Irish professional football player.
  
He played at club level for Bohemians, Glentoran, Sunderland, Hartlepool United, Cork Celtic and Cork Hibernian.
 
At Roker Park he scored on his home debut against Chelsea and played alongside Charlie Hurley and Brian Clough.

In 1964 he became the first Hartlepool player to make an international appearance when he won the last of his 11 caps for the Republic of Ireland national football team against Spain.

His full international debut for Ireland was on 11 May 1960 when he played in a 1-0 friendly win over West Germany in Düsseldorf.

Fogarty signed as player/manager of Drumcondra F.C. in March 1971.

After his football career ended, he was manager of Cork Hibernians, Cork Celtic, Drumcondra, Limerick, and Athlone Town who he managed in a famous 0–0 draw against A.C. Milan in the 1975–76 UEFA Cup. He was the first manager of Galway Rovers in 1977.

References

1933 births
2016 deaths
Association footballers from Dublin (city)
Republic of Ireland association footballers
Republic of Ireland international footballers
Republic of Ireland football managers
Expatriate footballers in England
Republic of Ireland expatriate association footballers
Bohemian F.C. players
League of Ireland players
Glentoran F.C. players
NIFL Premiership players
Sunderland A.F.C. players
Hartlepool United F.C. players
English Football League players
Cork Hibernians F.C. players
Cork Celtic F.C. players
Drumcondra F.C. players
Bray Wanderers F.C. players
Athlone Town A.F.C. managers
Galway United F.C. managers
League of Ireland managers
Drumcondra F.C. managers
Association football midfielders